Baldomiro Benquet (born 1 June 1907, date of death unknown) was a Uruguayan rower. He competed in the men's coxless pair event at the 1936 Summer Olympics.

References

External links
 

1907 births
Year of death missing
Uruguayan male rowers
Olympic rowers of Uruguay
Rowers at the 1936 Summer Olympics
Place of birth missing
20th-century Uruguayan people